Smilez & Southstar was a hip-hop duo based in Orlando, Florida. The group was made up of Rodney "Smilez" Bailey and Rob "Southstar" Campman. They are best known for their hit single "Tell Me."

Discography

Albums
Crash the Party

Singles

Singles

References

American hip hop groups
Musical groups from Orlando, Florida
Hip hop duos
American musical duos
Southern hip hop groups